The Charles Tour, currently titled as the Jennian Homes Charles Tour for sponsorship reasons, is a New Zealand-based golf tour run by Golf New Zealand and the New Zealand PGA. It is named after Bob Charles. The tour was founded in 2008, replacing the Golf Tour of New Zealand which had run from 2004 to 2007.

In September 2015, the tour undertook a title sponsorship by New Zealand-based home building company Jennian Homes.

With the exception of the Super 6 event, tournaments are over 72 holes, played over 4 days. They feature a mixture of professionals and amateurs, men and women. There have been between four and six tournaments each year. Michael Hendry has the most wins on the tour, with eight between 2009 and 2022.

Jennian Homes Trophy
The Jennian Homes Trophy was first contested in 2015–16, and was won by Jim Cusdin, despite not winning during the season. The 2016–17 trophy was won by the winner of the final event, Mark Brown. Daniel Pearce won twice in the 2017–18 and led the Order of Merit. In 2018 it was decided to change the season to match the calendar year. The 2018–19 season covered the period from mid-2018 to the end of 2019, the Jennian Homes Trophy begin won by James Anstiss. Daniel Hillier won the 2020 Order of Merit, covering the 2020 calendar year. Ryan Fox took the trophy in 2021, winning two of the tour events in a reduced season. Sam Jones won  in 2022 with one win and a number of high finishes.

2023 season

Schedule
The following table lists official events during the 2023 season.

2022 season

Schedule
The following table lists official events during the 2022 season.

Order of Merit
The Order of Merit was titled as the Jennian Homes Trophy and was based on prize money won during the season, calculated using a points-based system.

2021 season

Schedule
The following table lists official events during the 2021 season.

Order of Merit
The Order of Merit was titled as the Jennian Homes Trophy and was based on prize money won during the season, calculated using a points-based system.

2020 season

Schedule
The following table lists official events during the 2020 season.

2018–19 season

Schedule
The following table lists official events during the 2018–19 season.

2017–18 season

Schedule
The following table lists official events during the 2017–18 season.

2016–17 season

Schedule
The following table lists official events during the 2016–17 season.

2015–16 season

Schedule
The following table lists official events during the 2015–16 season.

2015 season

Schedule
The following table lists official events during the 2015 season.

2014 season

Schedule
The following table lists official events during the 2014 season.

2013 season

Schedule
The following table lists official events during the 2013 season.

2012 season

Schedule
The following table lists official events during the 2012 season.

2011 season

Schedule
The following table lists official events during the 2011 season.

2010 season

Schedule
The following table lists official events during the 2010 season.

2009 season

Schedule
The following table lists official events during the 2009 season.

2008 season

Schedule
The following table lists official events during the 2008 season.

Order of Merit winners

Notes

References

Golf in New Zealand
Professional golf tours